Tarouca is a municipality and a city in Viseu District in Norte Region and Douro Subregion in Portugal. The population in 2011 was 8,046, in an area of 100.08 km2.

The city of Tarouca proper has about 3,400 residents; it was promoted to city in December 2004. The present mayor is Mário Caetano Teixeira Ferreira, elected by the Socialist Party. The municipal holiday is June 29.

Parishes

Administratively, the municipality is divided into 7 civil parishes (freguesias):
 Gouviães e Ucanha
 Granja Nova
 Mondim da Beira
 Salzedas
 São João de Tarouca
 Tarouca e Dálvares
 Várzea da Serra

Notable people 
 José Leite de Vasconcelos (1858 in Ucanha, Tarouca – 1941) a Portuguese ethnographer, archaeologist and author who wrote extensively on Portuguese philology and prehistory.

References

External links
Everything about Tarouca
Photos from Tarouca

Cities in Portugal
Populated places in Viseu District
Municipalities of Viseu District
People from Tarouca